The following is a list of BC Lions all time records and statistics current to the 2022 CFL season. Each category lists the top five players, where known, except for when the fifth place player is tied in which case all players with the same number are listed. Games and seasons played lists the top ten players.

Grey Cup championships

As a player:
3 - Lui Passaglia

As a Head Coach:
2 - Wally Buono

Games 

Most Games Played
408 – Lui Passaglia (1976–2000)
265 – Jamie Taras (1987–2002)
233 – Al Wilson (1972–86)
223 – Norm Fieldgate (1954–67)
212 – Ryan Phillips (2005–16)
202 – Cory Mantyka (1993–2005)
197 – Jim Young (1967–79)
197 – Angus Reid (2001–12)
194 – Geroy Simon (2001–12)
192 – Glen Jackson (1976–87)

Most Seasons Played
25 – Lui Passaglia (1976–2000)
16 – Jamie Taras (1987–2002)
15 – Al Wilson (1972–86)
14 – Norm Fieldgate (1954–67)
13 – Jim Young (1967–79)
13 – Cory Mantyka (1993–2005)
13 – Bret Anderson (1997–2009)
12 – Greg Findlay (1962–73)
12 – Glen Jackson (1976–87)
12 – Angus Reid (2001–12)
12 – Geroy Simon (2001–12)
12 – Ryan Phillips (2005–16)
12 – Paul McCallum (1993–94, 2006–14, 2016)

Scoring 

Most points – career
3991 – Lui Passaglia (1976–2000)
1506 – Paul McCallum (1993–94, 2006–14, 2016)
570 – Ted Gerela (1967–73)
568 – Geroy Simon (2001–12)
523 – Willie Fleming (1959–66)

Most points – season
214 – Lui Passaglia – 1987
210 – Lui Passaglia – 1991
203 – Paul McCallum – 2011
197 – Lui Passaglia – 1998
194 – Lui Passaglia – 1995

Most points – game
25 – Willie Fleming – versus Saskatchewan Roughriders, October 29, 1960
24 – Larry Key – at Calgary Stampeders, Jul 31, 1981
24 – Mervyn Fernandez – 3 times
24 – Lui Passaglia – versus Toronto Argonauts, Sep 6, 1985
24 – Cory Philpot – versus Hamilton Tiger-Cats, Sep 16, 1995
24 – Alfred Jackson – versus Montreal Alouettes, Aug 4, 2001
24 – Sean Millington – versus Hamilton Tiger-Cats, Jul 18, 2002
24 – Geroy Simon – at Hamilton Tiger-Cats, Aug 13, 2004
24 – James Butler – versus Edmonton Elks, Jun 11, 2022

Most touchdowns – career
94 – Geroy Simon (2001–12)
87 – Willie Fleming (1959–66)
78 – Sean Millington (1991–97, 2000–02)
68 – Jim Young (1967–79)
58 – Mervyn Fernandez (1982–86, 94)

Most touchdowns – season
22 – Cory Philpot (1995)
20 – Jon Volpe (1991)
19 – Larry Key (1981)
19 – Joe Smith (2007)
18 – Willie Fleming (1960)
18 – David Williams (1988)

Most touchdowns – game
4 – Willie Fleming – versus Saskatchewan Roughriders, October 29, 1960
4 – Larry Key – at Calgary Stampeders, Jul 31, 1981
4 – Mervyn Fernandez – versus Winnipeg Blue Bombers, Jul 6, 1984
4 – Mervyn Fernandez – at Ottawa Rough Riders, Oct 13, 1984
4 – Mervyn Fernandez – versus Calgary Stampeders, Aug 17, 1985
4 – David Williams – versus Edmonton Eskimos, Oct 29, 1988
4 – Cory Philpot – versus Hamilton Tiger-Cats, Sep 16, 1995
4 – Alfred Jackson – versus Montreal Alouettes, Aug 4, 2001
4 – Sean Millington – versus Hamilton Tiger-Cats, Jul 18, 2002
4 – Geroy Simon – at Hamilton Tiger-Cats, Aug 13, 2004
4 – James Butler – versus Edmonton Elks, Jun 11, 2022

Most rushing touchdowns – career
66 – Sean Millington – (1991–97, 2000–02)
47 – Larry Key – (1978–82)
42 – Cory Philpot – (1993–97)
38 – Willie Fleming – (1959–66)
32 – Jim Evenson – (1968–72)
32 – Robert Drummond – (1998–2001)

Most rushing touchdowns – season
19 – Joe Smith (2007)
17 – Cory Philpot (1995)
17 – Larry Key (1981)
16 – Jon Volpe (1991)

Most rushing touchdowns – game
4 – Larry Key – at Calgary Stampeders, Jul 31, 1981
4 – Sean Millington – versus Hamilton Tiger-Cats, Jul 18, 2002

Most receiving touchdowns – career
93 – Geroy Simon – (2001–12)
65 – Jim Young – (1967–79)
57 – Mervyn Fernandez – (1982–86, 94)
55 – Emmanuel Arceneaux – (2009–10, 2013–18)
46 – Mike Trevathan – (1991–97)

Most receiving touchdowns – season
18 – David Williams (1988)
17 – Mervyn Fernandez (1984)
15 – Mervyn Fernandez (1985)
15 – Geroy Simon (2006)

Most receiving touchdowns – game
4 – Mervyn Fernandez – versus Winnipeg Blue Bombers, Jul 6, 1984
4 – Mervyn Fernandez – at Ottawa Rough Riders, Oct 13, 1984
4 – Mervyn Fernandez – versus Calgary Stampeders, Aug 17, 1985
4 – David Williams – versus Edmonton Eskimos, Oct 29, 1988
4 – Alfred Jackson – versus Montreal Alouettes, Aug 4, 2001
4 – Geroy Simon – at Hamilton Tiger-Cats, Aug 13, 2004

Passing 

Most passing yards – career
27,621 – Damon Allen – (1996–2002)
26,718 – Roy Dewalt – (1980–87)
21,352 – Travis Lulay – (2009–18)
16,675 – Joe Kapp – (1961–66) 
13,573 – Dave Dickenson – (2003–07)

Most passing yards – season
6619 – Doug Flutie – 1991
5496 – Dave Dickenson – 2003
5226 – Jonathon Jennings – 2016
5088 – Casey Printers – 2004
4840 – Damon Allen – 2000

Most passing yards – game
601 – Danny Barrett – versus Toronto Argonauts, August 12, 1993
582 – Doug Flutie – versus Edmonton Eskimos, October 12, 1991
523 – Kent Austin – versus Toronto Argonauts, August 11, 1994
509 – Dave Dickenson – versus Ottawa Renegades, July 18, 2003
504 – Roy Dewalt – versus Winnipeg Blue Bombers, October 6, 1985

Most passing attempts – career
3421 – Damon Allen – (1996–2002)
2898 – Roy Dewalt – (1980–87)
2613 – Travis Lulay – (2009–18)
2044 – Joe Kapp – (1961–66) 
1474 – Jonathon Jennings – (2015–18)

Most passing attempts – season
730 – Doug Flutie – 1991
597 – Matt Dunigan – 1989
583 – Damon Allen – 1997
583 – Travis Lulay – 2011

Most passing attempts – game
57 – Damon Allen – versus Hamilton Tiger-Cats, September 6, 1997
56 – Tony Kimbrough – versus Hamilton Tiger-Cats, August 6, 1992

Most passing completions – career
2037 – Damon Allen – (1996–2002)
1705 – Roy Dewalt – (1980–87)
1658 – Travis Lulay – (2009–18)
1089 – Joe Kapp – (1961–66) 
980 – Jonathon Jennings – (2015–18)

Most passing completions – season
466 – Doug Flutie – 1991
378 – Damon Allen – 1997
371 – Jonathon Jennings – 2016
370 – Dave Dickenson – 2003

Most passing completions – game
39 – Nathan Rourke – versus Toronto Argonauts, June 25, 2022
39 – Nathan Rourke – at Calgary Stampeders, August 13, 2022
38 – Buck Pierce – at Montreal Alouettes, August 29, 2008
37 – Doug Flutie – at Saskatchewan Roughriders, August 21, 1991

Most passing touchdowns – career
136 – Damon Allen – (1996–2002)
129 – Roy Dewalt – (1980–87)
127 – Travis Lulay – (2009–18)
97 – Joe Kapp – (1961–66)
90 – Dave Dickenson – (2003–07)

Most passing touchdowns – season
38 – Doug Flutie – (1991)
36 – Dave Dickenson – (2003)
35 – Casey Printers – (2004)
32 – Travis Lulay – (2011)
28 – Joe Kapp – (1962)
28 – Joe Paopao – (1981)

Most passing touchdowns – game
6 – Joe Kapp – at Edmonton Eskimos, September 29, 1962
6 – Dave Dickenson – at Ottawa Renegades, July 18, 2003
5 – Doug Flutie – versus Saskatchewan Roughriders, August 21, 1991
5 – Dave Dickenson – versus Hamilton Tiger-Cats, August 22, 2003
5 – Dave Dickenson – versus Saskatchewan Roughriders, June 16, 2006
5 – Jarious Jackson – at Winnipeg Blue Bombers, July 11, 2008
5 – Mike Reilly – versus Toronto Argonauts, October 5, 2019
5 – Nathan Rourke – versus Edmonton Elks, August 6, 2022

Rushing 

Most rushing attempts – career
1,151 – Jim Evenson – (1968–72)
933 – Sean Millington – (1991–97, 2000–02)
914 – John Henry White – (1978-87)
887 – Larry Key – (1978–82)
868 – Willie Fleming – (1959–66)

Most rushing attempts – season
281 – Joe Smith – 2007
260 – Jim Evenson – 1971
257 – Robert Drummond – 1999
255 – Jim Evenson – 1969
248 – Jim Evenson – 1968

Most rushing attempts – game
32 – Jim Evenson – versus Winnipeg Blue Bombers, October 19, 1968

Most rushing yards – career
6125 – Willie Fleming – (1959–66)
5708 – Jim Evenson – (1968–72)
4984 – Sean Millington – (1991–97, 2000–02)
4715 – John Henry White – (1978-87)
4532 – Larry Key – (1978–82)

Most rushing yards – season 
1510 – Joe Smith – 2007
1451 – Cory Philpot – 1994
1395 – Jon Volpe – 1991
1309 – Robert Drummond – 1999
1308 – Cory Philpot – 1995
1287 – Jim Evenson – 1969
1240 – Martell Mallett – 2009
1239 – Lou Harris – 1974
1237 – Jim Evenson – 1971
1234 – Willie Fleming – 1963
1220 – Jim Evenson – 1968
1176 – Monroe Eley – 1974
1161 – Nub Beamer – 1962
1136 – Antonio Warren – 2004
1119 – Mike Strickland – 1976
1112 – Andrew Harris – 2012
1098 – Larry Key – 1981
1060 – Larry Key – 1979
1054 – Bob Swift – 1964
1054 – Larry Key – 1978
1051 – Willie Fleming – 1960
1048 – Kelvin Anderson – 2003
1039 – Andrew Harris – 2015
1029 – Johnny Musso – 1973
1024 – Cory Philpot – 1996
1010 – Sean Millington – 2000
1004 - John White - 2019
1003 – Jim Evenson – 1970

Most rushing yards – game
213 – Martell Mallett – versus Montreal Alouettes, Sept 4, 2009
212 – Sean Millington – at Saskatchewan Roughriders, August 15, 1997
206 – Keyvan Jenkins – at Toronto Argonauts, August 1, 1985
202 – Jim Evenson – at Winnipeg Blue Bombers, October 26, 1969
202 – Lou Harris – versus Winnipeg Blue Bombers, August 8, 1974

Longest run
109 – Willie Fleming – at Edmonton Eskimos, October 17, 1964
98 – Willie Fleming – at Edmonton Eskimos, September 19, 1960
97 – Willie Fleming – at Calgary Stampeders, October 20, 1962
97 – Willie Fleming – versus Calgary Stampeders, September 7, 1963
97 – Willie Fleming – at Winnipeg Blue Bombers, October 27, 1963

Receiving 

Most receiving yards – career
14,756 – Geroy Simon – (2001–12)
9248 – Jim Young – (1967–79)
8169 – Emmanuel Arceneaux – (2009–10, 2013–18)
7212 – Bryan Burnham – (2014–19, 2021–22)
6690 – Mervyn Fernandez – (1982–86,94)

Most receiving yards – season
1856 – Geroy Simon – 2006
1750 – Geroy Simon – 2004
1731 – Darren Flutie – 1994
1727 – Mervyn Fernandez – 1985
1687 – Geroy Simon – 2003

Most receiving yards – game
270 – Tyrone Gray – at Edmonton Eskimos, September 12, 1981
266 – Alfred Jackson – versus Winnipeg Blue Bombers, July 18, 1997
259 – Mervyn Fernandez – versus Calgary Stampeders, August 17, 1985
247 – Alfred Jackson – versus Montreal Alouettes, August 21, 2002
238 – Geroy Simon – versus Edmonton Eskimos, September 13, 2003

Most receptions – career
904 – Geroy Simon – (2001–12)
556 – Emmanuel Arceneaux – (2009–10, 2013–18)
552 – Jim Young – (1967–79)
476 – Bryan Burnham – (2014–19, 2021–22)
428 – Jason Clermont – (2002–08)

Most receptions – season
111 – Darren Flutie – 1994
105 – Geroy Simon – 2006
105 – Emmanuel Arceneaux – 2016
104 – Ray Alexander – 1991
103 – Geroy Simon – 2004

Most receptions – game
14 – Ray Alexander – 1991
14 – Eric Streater – 1989
14 – Darren Flutie – 1995

Interceptions 

Most interceptions – career
51 – Larry Crawford – (1981–89)
47 – Ryan Phillips – (2005–16)
37 – Norm Fieldgate – (1954–67)
36 – Barron Miles – (2005–09)
34 – Keith Gooch – (1984–89)

Most interceptions – season
12 – Larry Crawford – 1983
12 – Ryan Phillips – 2007
11 – Less Browne – 1994
10 – Rich Robinson – 1970
10 – Steve Muhammad – 1998
10 – Barron Miles – 2006

Most interceptions – game
3 – Primo Villanueva – 1955
3 – Paul Cameron – 1958
3 – Norm Fieldgate – 1962
3 – Rich Robinson – 1969
3 – Wayne Matherne – 1971
3 – Larry Crawford – 1981
3 – Larry Crawford – 1983
3 – Melvin Byrd – 1985
3 – Eric Carter – 1999

Most interception return yards – career
816 – Ryan Phillips – (2005–16)
790 – Larry Crawford – (1981–89)
580 – Melvin Byrd – (1982–87)
529 – Barron Miles – (2005–09)
511 – Jerry Bradley – (1968–70)

Most interception return yards – season
299 – Ryan Phillips – 2007
188 – Jerry Bradley – 1970

Most interception return yards – game
129 – Melvin Byrd – versus Ottawa Rough Riders, August 11, 1984
120 – Neal Beaumont – versus Saskatchewan Roughriders, October 12, 1963

Longest interception return
120 – Neal Beaumont – versus Saskatchewan Roughriders, October 12, 1963
115 – Melvin Byrd – versus Ottawa Rough Riders, August 11, 1984
107 – Melvin Byrd – at Calgary Stampeders, October 16, 1983

Tackles (since 1987) 
Most defensive tackles – career
745 – Solomon Elimimian – (2010–18)
587 – Dante Marsh – (2004–14)
509 – Adam Bighill – (2011–16)
489 – Ryan Phillips – (2005–16)
448 – Barrin Simpson – (2001–06)

Most defensive tackles – season
144 – Solomon Elimimian – 2017
143 – Solomon Elimimian – 2014
129 – Solomon Elimimian – 2016
121 – Adam Bighill – 2015
115 – Alondra Johnson – 1989
115 – Barrin Simpson – 2001

Most defensive tackles – game
15 – Solomon Elimimian – at Montreal Alouettes, July 6, 2017
14 – Solomon Elimimian – at Toronto Argonauts, August 31, 2016
13 – Tracy Gravely – versus Saskatchewan Roughriders, August 13, 1992
13 – Adam Bighill – at Saskatchewan Roughriders, September 29, 2012
13 – Dante Marsh – at Saskatchewan Roughriders, September 22, 2013
13 – Adam Bighill – versus Toronto Argonauts, July 24, 2015
13 – Solomon Elimimian – versus Ottawa Redblacks, October 1, 2016
13 – Solomon Elimimian – versus Ottawa Redblacks, October 8, 2017

Most special team tackles – career
190 – Jason Arakgi – (2008–16)
140 – Sean Millington – (1991–97, 2000–02)
118 – Kelly Lochbaum – (1997–2000, 2002–05)

Most special team tackles – season
35 – Mike Maurer – 2001
35 – Jason Arakgi – 2009
32 – Jason Arakgi – 2008

Most special team tackles – game
6 – Steve Glenn – versus Toronto Argonauts, July 24, 1997
6 – Chuck Levy – versus Winnipeg Blue Bombers, October 9, 2000
6 – Mike Maurer – versus Edmonton Eskimos, August 11, 2001
6 – Chandler Fenner – versus Edmonton Eskimos, October 21, 2017

Quarterback sacks 

Most sacks – career
89 – Brent Johnson – (2001–11)
82.5 – James Parker – (1984–89)
56 – Mack Moore – (1981–84, 1988–89)

Most sacks – season
26.5 – James Parker – 1984
23 – Gregg Stumon – 1987
23 – Cameron Wake – 2008
22 – James Parker – 1986
20 – O. J. Brigance – 1993

Most sacks – game
5 – Mack Moore – at Ottawa Rough Riders, September 3, 1982
5 – Daved Benefield – versus Birmingham Barracudas, August 3, 1995

Field goals 

Most Field Goals – Career
875 – Lui Passaglia (1976–2000)
348 – Paul McCallum (1993–94, 2006–14, 2016)
123 – Ted Gerela (1967–73)
82 – Ty Long (2017–18)
65 – Richie Leone (2015–16)

Most Field Goals – Season
52 – Lui Passaglia – 1987
52 – Lui Passaglia – 1998
50 – Paul McCallum – 2011
46 – Paul McCallum – 2010
45 – Lui Passaglia – 1995

Most Field Goals – Game
7 – Lui Passaglia – versus Toronto Argonauts, September 6, 1995
7 – Lui Passaglia – at Saskatchewan Roughriders, October 25, 1998

Highest Field Goal Accuracy – Career (minimum 75 attempts)
88.2% (82/93) – Ty Long (2017–18)
85.9% (348/405) – Paul McCallum (1993–94, 2006–14, 2016)
72.7% (875/1,203) – Lui Passaglia (1976–2000)
72.2% (65/90) – Richie Leone (2015–16)
65.9% (56/85) – Matt Kellett (2002–03)

Highest Field Goal Accuracy – Season (minimum 30 attempts)
94.3% (50/53) – Paul McCallum – 2011
92.3% (36/39) – Sean Whyte – 2022
91.2% (41/45) – Sergio Castillo – 2019
90.9% (40/44) – Lui Passaglia – 2000
88.6% (39/44) – Ty Long – 2017

Longest Field Goal
56 – Richie Leone – versus Saskatchewan Roughriders, July 10, 2015
54 – Lui Passaglia – four times, most recently at Edmonton Eskimos, October 20, 1991
54 – Matt Kellett – at Winnipeg Blue Bombers, August 9, 2002
54 – Curtis Head – at Saskatchewan Roughriders, June 28, 2003

Most Consecutive Field Goals
30 – Paul McCallum (July 16, 2011 – October 8, 2011)
24 – Paul McCallum (October 9, 2009 – July 30, 2010)
23 – Paul McCallum (July 12, 2014 – September 13, 2014)
20 – Ty Long (September 16, 2017 – June 16, 2018)

References 
BC Lions Individual Records
BC Lions Media Guides
CFL Guide & Record Book, 2022 Edition
CFL website

records
BC Lions